This is a list of annual Pac-12 Conference football champions. Co-champions are listed with the conference's Rose Bowl representative first. Pacific Coast Conference results are included. Since 2011, the Pac-12 Football Championship Game has determined the champion.  PCC champions were awarded the Schwabacher Trophy.

Champions by year
The following teams have been designated as champions by the conference.

† The NCAA sanctioned USC in June, 2010 for violations in the football, men's basketball, and women's tennis programs. USC football vacated two wins from their final two games of the 2004 season (one conference game and a bowl game) and all 12 wins from the 2005 season, as well as the conference titles from both years. Their 2004 BCS National Championship was vacated, while their 2004 Associated Press title was not removed.
‡ California claims five national titles that are based upon one contemporary "major selector" (Dick Dunkel in 1937) and seven retrospective selectors listed in the NCAA Football Bowl Subdivision Records (five of the eight selectors being math systems).
§ Stanford was selected in 1926 by a contemporary “major selector” (Frank Dickinson) and later by three retrospective selectors (two of the four being math systems).
@ USC claims national titles in 1931 and 1932 that are based upon four contemporary “major selectors” (William Boand, Frank Dickinson, Dick Dunkel, and Deke Houlgate) and nine later retrospective selectors (nine of the 13 selectors being math systems). USC claims national titles in 1928 and 1939 that are based upon a contemporary selector (Dickinson) and a retrospective selector (1928 only), both math systems.
^ Washington was selected in 1960 by the Helms Athletic Foundation.

Championships by team

^ Does not include USC's vacated 2004 and 2005 Pacific-10 Conference titles

Pac-12 Championship Game

Since 2011, the championship game has determined the conference champion. The game matches the highest-placed team from the North and South Divisions. From inauguration until 2017, the North Division representative won every championship game. (AP Poll rankings are indicated.)

Division championships

North Division 

† - Shared championship
‡ - Washington was replaced in the 2020 conference championship game by runner-up Oregon due to insufficient student-athletes during the COVID-19 pandemic
Bold  - Championship game participant

South Division 

† - Shared championship
‡ - UCLA won the 2011 title as USC was ineligible for postseason play
Bold  - Championship game participant

See also
 College football national championships in NCAA Division I FBS
 List of Pac-12 Conference football standings

Notes

References
General

 Associated Press Final Season Polls 
 Year–by–Year Final Coaches' Polls

Specific

Pac-12 Conference
Champions